Harsha Cooray (born 23 November 1983) is a Sri Lankan cricketer. He made his first-class debut for Saracens Sports Club in the 2005–06 Premier Trophy on 16 December 2005.

See also
 List of Chilaw Marians Cricket Club players

References

External links
 

1983 births
Living people
Sri Lankan cricketers
Chilaw Marians Cricket Club cricketers
Kilinochchi District cricketers
Panadura Sports Club cricketers
Saracens Sports Club cricketers
Cricketers from Colombo